Guilherme Ferreira Pinto (born 7 April 1992), known as Guilherme Negueba or simply Negueba, is a Brazilian footballer who plays as a winger or a forward for Thai club Port F.C..

Career

Youth
Negueba came very young to Flamengo as a futsal player. The young midfielder had brief passages in Jacarepaguá Tênis Clube and the Jequiá da Ilha before reaching Flamengo's youth team as a prospect for the future.

Professional
The young Negueba went through all the categories of the youth divisions of Flamengo, and got his first opportunity at the professional team in 2010, with Vanderlei Luxemburgo as the team manager. At that time, Negueba, who was only 18 years old incomplete, won a vote of confidence not only of the veteran manager, but the entire squad represented by team captain Leonardo Moura.

On November 7, 2010, he had his début, starting in a 0–1 loss against Atlético Paranaense in a Brazilian Série A match at Estádio Raulino de Oliveira.

After the end of 2010 Brazilian Série A, Flamengo announced Negueba had his contract renewed for another 5 years.

After consecutive poor matches and repeated mistakes, Negueba lost prestige with the squad. After a loss to Santos, arguably caused by two individual errors by Negueba, the player was not included in any further match day squad of the team.  Negueba protested a possible move to Avaí FC, proposed by the club's managers, but accepted a move to another club. On September 20, 2012, São Paulo confirmed Negueba as a member of its 2013 squad. As part of the loan deal, Cléber Santana went in exchange to Flamengo. Negueba had previously refused a move to Lisbon's Sporting, as he was seen as an important part of the squad by Joel Santana, and also as being too young for an international move.

On January 5, 2013, one day after his presentation in São Paulo, Negueba went through surgery due to a knee injury. He remained sidelined for six months. On September 1, almost eight months after his arrival to the club, Negueba finally made his debut for São Paulo FC, coming from the bench at 82 minutes in a 0–0 draw against Botafogo, for the Brazilian Série A. According to the winger, "it was a happy moment. I could début for São Paulo, at Maracanã Stadium, where greats already played, and I felt good." Two days later, Negueba made his second game wearing the shirt of Tricolor Paulista, this time in a 1–0 victory against Náutico, again coming from the bench in the second half. Applauded by the fans, Negueba praised them, saying: "I am going to do my best to help the team."

However, two months before the end of his contract with São Paulo, Negueba, not being a part of Muricy Ramalho's plans, was dismissed by the club, returning to Flamengo.

On the June 6, 2016 it was involved In a change changes player Edinho, in the which Negueba will act for Grêmio.

Career Statistics
(Correct )

Honours

Club
Flamengo
Copa São Paulo de Futebol Júnior: 2011
Campeonato Carioca: 2011, 2014
Taça Rio: 2011
Taça Guanabara: 2011, 2014

Londrina
Primeira Liga: 2017

International
Brazil U20
FIFA U-20 World Cup: 2011

References

External links
Player profile @ Flapédia (in Portuguese)

1992 births
Living people
Brazilian footballers
Brazil under-20 international footballers
Brazil youth international footballers
Brazilian expatriate footballers
Brazilian expatriate sportspeople in South Korea
Expatriate footballers in South Korea
Association football forwards
Campeonato Brasileiro Série A players
Campeonato Brasileiro Série B players
K League 1 players
K League 2 players
CR Flamengo footballers
São Paulo FC players
Coritiba Foot Ball Club players
Grêmio Foot-Ball Porto Alegrense players
Atlético Clube Goianiense players
Associação Atlética Ponte Preta players
Londrina Esporte Clube players
Gyeongnam FC players
Incheon United FC players
Negueba
Footballers from Rio de Janeiro (city)